Aythami Jesús Álvarez González (born 27 August 1988 in Las Palmas, Canary Islands), known simply as Aythami, is a Spanish professional footballer who plays for UD Tamaraceite as a right-back.

External links

1988 births
Living people
Spanish footballers
Footballers from Las Palmas
Association football defenders
Segunda División players
Segunda División B players
Tercera División players
Segunda Federación players
Tercera Federación players
Divisiones Regionales de Fútbol players
UD Las Palmas Atlético players
UD Las Palmas players
SD Huesca footballers
Barakaldo CF footballers
UD Tamaraceite footballers